A special election was held in Georgia's 24th state senate district on June 19, 2007, to replace State Senator Jim Whitehead, who resigned from the seat to run for US Congress in Georgia's 10th congressional district's special election. Four candidates qualified for the election. The election was won by Bill Jackson who received over 62% of the vote.

Results

References

State Senate